Dezi Gallegos is a playwright based in Los Angeles, California who currently works at Proximity Media.

Biography

Dez Gallegos (usually referred to as "Dezi"), was born on September 8, 1995 in Petaluma, California. He began his writing career at the age of eight when he gained county-wide fame for penning a 300-page fan-fiction manuscript for JK Rowling's Harry Potter series.
 
In 2010, Gallegos co-wrote and assistant directed Walking Elephant Theater Company's Prop 8 Love Stories. The show toured throughout the California Bay Area before performing in New York's Off-Broadway for two weeks. The production was named as Broadway World's "Best Special Theater Event" of 2010. Prop 8 Love Stories was published in 2012.

Throughout his high school career, Gallegos wrote and directed Quite Dead (2012) and God Fights the Plague (2014). The latter was a one-man show in San Francisco's historic The Marsh Theater. In 2015 he was awarded the Annette Lust Award for Promising Theatrical Talent presented by the San Francisco Bay Area Theatre Critics Circle.

While working as faculty for Cinnabar Theater in Petaluma, CA, Gallegos worked with a group of 9-14 year olds to write, direct, and produce Hamlet's Orphans (2014), a production which was chosen for Best Original Script by the SFBATCC.

In 2015, Gallegos gave a talk entitled "The Human Behind the Hashtag" at the Sonoma County TED (conference). Earlier that year he had released a production of his newest drama, Yesterday Again. The show was awarded the 2016 SOTA Award for Best New Play as well as named one of North Bay Stage and Screen's "Top Ten Torn Tickets of 2015".

Gallegos has been featured in KQED, The Daily Californian, and The San Francisco Examiner, among other periodicals. He was nominated as one of Sonoma County's "30 under 30"(2016). In 2018, he graduated from the School of Cinematic Arts, University of Southern California with a BFA in Film and Television Production. Since, he has worked on films such as Run, Judas and the Black Messiah, and the upcoming Space Jam: A New Legacy.

Written works
Harry Potter and the Fang of the Serpent (2003) unpublished
Prop 8 Love Stories (Booktrope Editions, 2012). 
Quite Dead (2012)
God Fights the Plague (2014)
Hamlet's Orphans (2014)
Yesterday Again (2015)
Lost in Aroncore (2017)
My Ex-Girlfriend is a Shovel (2018)

References

Living people
American dramatists and playwrights
1995 births
People from Petaluma, California